Brigadier George Streynsham Rawstorne CBE, MC (22 January 1895 – 15 July 1962) was an English soldier and cricketer. He was born in Croston, near Chorley, Lancashire and died at Rovie, Rogart, Sutherland.

The son of a bishop, Rawstorne was educated at Eton College and was in the cricket team for three years to 1914; he was captain in his last year. He also made a single appearance for the Lancashire Second XI in 1913. Rawstorne made his first and only first-class appearance in 1919, in Lancashire's first County Championship fixture for nearly five years. Batting in the middle order, he scored 2 runs in the only innings in which he batted, as Lancashire ran out victors by a ten-wicket margin.

During World War II, Rawstorne commanded the 15th Brigade in North Africa and Sicily. From 1945 until his retirement in 1947, he was the commanding officer of Inverness sub-district. From 1950 until his death, he served as Lord Lieutenant of Sutherland.

External links
George Rawstorne at Cricket Archive 
George Rawstorne at The Generals of World War II

1895 births
1962 deaths
People educated at Eton College
People from Croston
English cricketers
Lancashire cricketers
Lord-Lieutenants of Sutherland
British Army personnel of World War II
Seaforth Highlanders officers
Recipients of the Military Cross
Commanders of the Order of the British Empire